Tung Chye Hong (born 6 February 1945) is a Singaporean weightlifter. He competed in the men's bantamweight event at the 1968 Summer Olympics.

References

1945 births
Living people
Singaporean male weightlifters
Olympic weightlifters of Singapore
Weightlifters at the 1968 Summer Olympics
Place of birth missing (living people)
Weightlifters at the 1970 Asian Games
Commonwealth Games medallists in weightlifting
Commonwealth Games bronze medallists for Singapore
Weightlifters at the 1970 British Commonwealth Games
Asian Games competitors for Singapore
20th-century Singaporean people
Medallists at the 1970 British Commonwealth Games